İsmail Köybaşı (born 10 July 1989) is a Turkish professional footballer who plays as a left back for Göztepe.

Early life and club career
Born to a family from İskenderun, Köybaşı had begun to play football for İskenderunspor, a local club. Köybaşı started out as an attacking midfielder, but moved to left back after recommendations from his colleagues. He briefly played for another local club, İskenderun Kartalspor, before joining Gaziantepspor in 2006.

Gaziantepspor
Köybaşı began his professional career in the youth divisions of Gaziantepspor. On 6 May 2008, he signed his first professional contract. He featured in 24 matches with 21 starts during the 2008–09 season. At the end of the season, he was linked with the big four clubs of Turkey, choosing Beşiktaş in the end.

Beşiktaş
Köybaşı joined Beşiktaş in June 2009 for a fee of €6.5 million, as well as an exchange of two Beşiktaş players. He began playing with the team during pre-season friendlies, and made his competitive debut in a Super Cup match against Fenerbahçe on 2 August 2009. In November 2009, he provided the assist to Rodrigo Tello's goal in a 1–0 victory at Old Trafford against Manchester Utd in the Champions League. It was the first time since February 2005, spanning 23 games, that United had lost a group stage Champions League fixture at home. He scored his first league goal against Ankaragücü in December 2009.

In September 2011, he provided two assists against Bursaspor, one from the free kick when Tomáš Sivok scored with his head in the 87th minute and the second with a cross to Filip Hološko who also scored with his head in the 90th minute securing the victory of 2–1 in an away game.

Fenerbahçe
On 14 July 2016, he signed a 3-year contract with the club.

Granada
On 29 August 2019, free agent Köybaşı signed a one-year deal with newly-promoted La Liga side Granada CF.

International career
Köybaşı has featured for Turkey at U-21's level, where he gained five caps. Köybaşı was called up to the senior national team by Fatih Terim for a friendly match against Ukraine on 12 August 2009. He won his first cap, replacing Arda Turan in the 86th minute.

Career statistics
As of 15 May 2016.

Honours
Beşiktaş
Süper Lig: 2015–16
Türkiye Kupası: 2010–11

Trabzonspor
Süper Lig: 2021–22

References

External links
TFF Profile 

Köybaşı interview on Tam Saha, TFF official magazine 

1989 births
Living people
Turkish Arab people
People from İskenderun
Turkish footballers
Association football fullbacks
Gaziantepspor footballers
Beşiktaş J.K. footballers
Fenerbahçe S.K. footballers
Trabzonspor footballers
Göztepe S.K. footballers
Süper Lig players
TFF First League players
Granada CF footballers
UEFA Euro 2016 players
Turkey youth international footballers
Turkey under-21 international footballers
Turkey international footballers
Turkish expatriate footballers
Turkish expatriate sportspeople in Spain
Expatriate footballers in Spain
La Liga players
Sportspeople from Hatay